Hercules is a prominent crater located in the northeast part of the Moon, to the west of the crater Atlas. It lies along the east edge of a southward extension in the Mare Frigoris. To the west across the mare is Bürg. To the south is the ruined crater Williams.

The interior walls of Hercules have multiple terraces, and there is a small outer rampart. The crater floor has been flooded by lava in the past, and contains several areas of low albedo. The central peak has been buried, leaving only a low hill near the midpoint. The satellite crater Hercules G is located prominently just to the south of the center. The small crater Hercules E lies along the southern rim of Hercules.

In the past this crater has been reported as the site of some transient lunar phenomenon.

Satellite craters
By convention these features are identified on lunar maps by placing the letter on the side of the crater midpoint that is closest to Hercules.

The following craters have been renamed by the IAU.
 Hercules A — See Keldysh.

References

 
 
 
 
 
 
 
 
 
 
 
 

Impact craters on the Moon